WWE Hall of Fame (2014) was the event which featured the introduction of the 15th class to the WWE Hall of Fame. The event was produced by WWE on April 5, 2014 from the Smoothie King Center in New Orleans, Louisiana. The event took place the same weekend as WrestleMania XXX. The event aired live on the WWE Network, and was hosted by Jerry Lawler. A condensed one-hour version of the ceremony aired the following Monday after Raw, on the USA Network.

It was reported by some news outlets that the 2014 class of the WWE Hall of Fame was the most highly anticipated class yet.

Event
Due to the launch of the WWE Network shortly before WrestleMania XXX, this event featured the first ever "Red Carpet" event as a one-hour pre-show prior to the start of the event. The pre-show was hosted by Michael Cole, Maria Menounos, and Renee Young.

After Lita was inducted by Trish Stratus she shared a number of stories about how she started in professional wrestling from Mexico until eventually winding up in the WWE. One story Lita told was how she first met Arn Anderson and her desire to meet Rey Mysterio. Lita expressed that Anderson helped her meet Mysterio in exchange for a Miller Lite. Lita stated she never fulfilled that promise and wanted to now, at which point Stratus return with three Miller Lites, which Lita, Anderson and Mysterio shared.

Jake "The Snake" Roberts was inducted by Diamond Dallas Page. During both of their speeches, the two spoke about Roberts' issues with alcoholism and how he spent many months living with Page attempted to rehab. Roberts credited DDP Yoga with saving his life. Roberts concluded by thanking his kids for giving him a second chance after all he had put their family through over the years.

Mr. T was inducted by Gene Okerlund into the Hall of Fame. He praised mothers, and encouraged respect of mothers. He went long. 

Paul Bearer was posthumously inducted by Kane. During the induction, Kane shared several stories about traveling with Bearer and about their relationship. Due to Bearer's passing in March 2013 his induction was accepted in his honor by his sons Daniel and Michael Moody. Also The Undertaker made his appearance and pays respect to his manager, Paul Bearer.

Razor Ramon (Scott Hall) was inducted into the Hall of Fame by fellow The Outsider member Kevin Nash. Hall, similar to Roberts, spoke of his person issues with alcohol, and thanks Page for saving his life. Following the introduction two were joined on stage by fellow Kliq members, Triple H, Shawn Michaels and Sean Waltman.

Carlos Colón was introduced by his two sons Carlito, Eddie, and nephew Orlando Colón. Carlito before delivering his speech said that the WWE cut the amount of time he had to speak down, and it made him feel like he never really left the WWE.

The Ultimate Warrior was the final inductee into the 2014, inducted by Linda McMahon. At the end of the Warrior's speech he announced that he had signed a long-term contract that would allow him to serve as an ambassador for the WWE for several years to come.

Aftermath
Although The Ultimate Warrior announced he signed a long-term contract with the WWE, his appearance at Raw the following Monday would be his final WWE appearance. Warrior died on April 8, 2014 in Scottsdale, Arizona. According to reports, Warrior clutched his chest and collapsed at 5:50 p.m. while walking to his car with his wife outside of their hotel in Arizona. He was rushed to the hospital where he was pronounced dead at age 54. Warrior's colleagues said Warrior appeared frail during WrestleMania weekend, and said that he was sweating profusely and breathing heavily backstage. 

Following his death, the WWE created the Warrior Award, with the first award given at the 2015 Hall of Fame ceremony. The Warrior Award for those who have "exhibited unwavering strength and perseverance, and who lives life with the courage and compassion that embodies the indomitable spirit of the Ultimate Warrior."

Inductees

Individual
 Class headliners appear in boldface

Celebrity

References

WWE Hall of Fame ceremonies
2005 in professional wrestling
Professional wrestling in New Orleans
2005 in Louisiana
Events in New Orleans
April 2014 events in the United States